Jonathan Wren (born 26 March 1999) is an Irish former rugby union player. He played as a fullback or wing and represented Cork Constitution in the All-Ireland League.

Early life
Wren first began playing rugby at an early age for Crosshaven, and started at fullback for Presentation Brothers College in their 11–3 win against Glenstal Abbey School  in the final of the 2017 Munster Schools Rugby Senior Cup, in a team alongside former Munster teammates Seán French and Jack O'Sullivan. Wren has also won representation for Munster at under-18 and under-19 level, and Ireland at under-18 and under-19 level.

Cork Constitution
Wren was part of the Cork Con team that won the Munster Senior Cup and All-Ireland League Division 1A during the 2018–19 season.

Munster
Wren joined the Munster academy ahead of the 2018–19 season. After injury hampered his final year in the academy, Wren extended his time with the programme for the 2021–22 to continue his development. Following the disruption caused by the province's recent tour to South Africa, Wren made his senior competitive debut for Munster in their opening 2021–22 Champions Cup fixture away to English club Wasps on 12 December 2021, coming on as a replacement for Patrick Campbell in the province's 35–14 win. Wren was forced to retire from rugby at the end of the 2021–22 season on medical grounds.

Ireland
Wren was selected in the Ireland under-20s squad for the 2019 Six Nations Under 20s Championship, and started in the wins against England, Scotland, Italy, France, and Wales, as Ireland secured their first grand slam since 2007. He was retained in the under-20s squad for the 2019 World Rugby Under 20 Championship when it was confirmed in May 2019.

Honours

Presentation Brothers College
Munster Schools Rugby Senior Cup:
Winner (1): 2017

Cork Constitution
All-Ireland League Division 1A:
Winner (1): 2018–19
Munster Senior Cup:
Winner (2): 2018–19, 2019–20

Ireland under-20s
Six Nations Under 20s Championship:
Winner (1): 2019
Grand Slam:
Winner (1): 2019
 Triple Crown:
 Winner (1): 2019

References

External links
Munster Academy Profile
U20 Six Nations Profile

1999 births
Living people
People educated at Presentation Brothers College, Cork
Rugby union players from County Cork
Irish rugby union players
Cork Constitution players
Munster Rugby players
Rugby union fullbacks
Rugby union wings